Dolophrosyne sinuosa is a moth of the family Notodontidae first described by James S. Miller in 2008. It is found in the Cosnipata Valley east of Cuzco in Peru.

The length of the forewings is 11–11.5 mm for males. The forewings are triangular and somewhat narrow. The outer margin is gently convex. The ground color is dark charcoal gray, with a large white triangle extending from the wing base to slightly less than halfway out. The hindwings are broadly rounded and mostly white.

Etymology
The species name is taken from the Latin word sinuosus (meaning many bends) and refers to the sinuate lateral margin of the white forewing triangle.

References

Moths described in 2008
Notodontidae of South America